is a Japanese fencer. She competed in the women's team foil event at the 1964 Summer Olympics.

References

External links
 

1937 births
Living people
Japanese female foil fencers
Olympic fencers of Japan
Fencers at the 1964 Summer Olympics